A list of films produced in the Cinema of Austria in the 1980s ordered by year of release. For an alphabetical list of articles on Austrian films see :Category:Austrian films.

1980s

External links
 Austrian film at the Internet Movie Database
http://www.austrianfilm.com/

1980s
Austrian
Films